Tortricosia classeyi is a moth in the subfamily Arctiinae. It was described by Jeremy Daniel Holloway in 2001. It is found on Borneo.

The length of the forewings is about 8 mm.

References

Moths described in 2001
Cisthenina